Naka Muzzafra is an industrial area in Faizabad city in the Indian state of Uttar Pradesh and is subpost office of Faizabad.

Demographics
 India census, Naka Muzzafra had a population of 65,790. Males constitute 51% of the population and females 49%. Naka Muzzafra has an average literacy rate of 62%, higher than the national average of 59.5%: male literacy is 71%, and female literacy is 52%. In Naka Muzzafra, 17% of the population is under 6 years of age.

References

Neighbourhoods in Faizabad
Industrial Area in Faizabad